James Burns Belford (September 28, 1837 – January 10, 1910) was an American politician and a U.S. Representative from Colorado.

Biography
Born in Lewistown, Pennsylvania, Belford was the son of Samuel and Eliza Belford and cousin of Joseph McCrum Belford. He attended the common schools and Dickinson College in Carlisle, Pennsylvania. He studied law and was admitted to the bar in 1859.

Career
Belford moved to California, Missouri and commenced practice. He moved to La Porte, Indiana in 1860, and served as member of the Indiana House of Representatives in 1867. He was appointed an associate justice of the supreme court for the Colorado Territory in 1870 and moved to Central City. He moved to Denver in 1883.

Upon the admission of Colorado into the Union, Belford was elected as a Republican to the Forty-fourth Congress from the first district of Colorado and served from October 3, 1876, until March 3, 1877. He presented credentials as a Member-elect to the Forty-fifth Congress and served from March 4, 1877 until December 13, 1877, when he was succeeded by Thomas M. Patterson, who successfully contested the election.

Belford was elected to the Forty-sixth, Forty-seventh, and Forty-eighth Congresses, and served from March 4, 1879 to March 3, 1885. He served as chairman of the Committee on Expenditures in the Department of the Treasury during the Forty-seventh Congress. He was an unsuccessful candidate for renomination in 1884, and engaged in the practice of law in Denver until his death. He was known as the "Red Rooster of the Rockies" because of his flaming red hair and "magnificently roseate beard." In the mid-1890s he gained notoriety for successfully defending Denver conman and crime boss Soapy Smith in several cases.

Death
Belford died in Denver, Colorado, on January 10, 1910 (age 72 years, 104 days). He is interred at Riverside Cemetery, Denver, Colorado.

Family
He married Frances C. McEwen in 1860. Their daughter Frances Belford Wayne was a longtime newspaper journalist in Denver.

References

External links

Govtrack US Congress
The Political Graveyard

1837 births
1910 deaths
Republican Party members of the United States House of Representatives from Colorado
Republican Party members of the Colorado House of Representatives
Justices of the Colorado Supreme Court
19th-century American politicians
People from Lewistown, Pennsylvania
People from California, Missouri
19th-century American judges